PacketTrap Networks, Inc., later known as just PacketTrap, was a provider of network management and traffic analysis software for midsize companies.

History
PacketTrap was founded in 2006 and headquartered in San Francisco, California. It received $5 million in Series A venture capital from August Capital in 2007.

The company was purchased by Quest Software in 2009. PacketTrap was then bought by Dell in 2012 as part of a buyout of Quest. Dell discontinued development of the software in 2013. PacketTrap was established enough that other companies continued support of the legacy product through licensing agreements with Dell.

Features
PacketTrap features included Desktop Management, Server Management,  Monitor Cloud Assets, and others.

See also
 Comparison of network monitoring systems

References

External links
 PacketTrap's Products and Services
 Startup City - InformationWeek
 Network World, Denise Dubie, Nov, 2008. "10 IT Management Companies to Watch"
 Information Week, John Foley, Aug, 2008. "PacketTrap Challenges CA and IBM"
 Microsoft TechNet, Greg Steen, July, 2008. "New Products for IP Pros"
 PC Magazine, Jamie Bernstein, May, 2008. "Review: PacketTrap pt360"
 Network World, Denise Dubie, March, 2008 "Kicking the Tires of Management Software"
 What PC, Tony Luke, Feb, 2008. "A Tough Nut to Crack"
 Information Week, John Foley, Feb, 2008. "The Demise Of Commercial Open Source"

Software companies established in 2006
Networking companies of the United States
System administration
File transfer software
Port scanners
Network analyzers
2006 establishments in California
Software companies based in the San Francisco Bay Area
Defunct software companies of the United States
Software companies disestablished in 2013
2009 mergers and acquisitions
2012 mergers and acquisitions
Quest Software